The Georgia High School Association (GHSA) is an organization that governs athletics and activities for member high schools in Georgia, USA. GHSA is a member of the National Federation of State High School Associations. The association has 463 public and private high schools as members. GHSA organizes all sports and academic competitions as well as overseeing registration, training, and approves local area sports officials associations to administer regional athletics and activities per member schools.

Membership
Membership to the GHSA is voluntary and open to every high school in the state of Georgia, although participating private schools must have at least 150 students in their high school.  Many private schools that do not enter the GHSA compete in the interscholastic organization of the Georgia Independent School Association (GISA).  Member schools of the GHSA make most decisions by appointing region representatives who vote on proposals in the GHSA Executive Committee.  Individual decisions by regions are made by the schools in the region on such issues as region tiebreakers and hosting of region tournaments.  Members are divided into seven classes by size and then further divided into regions based on geographic locations.

History

At least one prior organisation was integrated into the GHSA. The Georgia Interscholastic Association (GIA) was a school sports league in Georgia. It was integrated into the GHSA in 1970.

The Big 7 Conference included large high schools for African American students in Georgia. The GIA was an expansion of this league that came include county high schools around the state.

As If We Were Ghosts is a documentary film made about the GIA and its athletes.

Classifications – Regions 

The GHSA currently has seven classes, AAAAAAA, AAAAAA, AAAAA, AAAA, AAA, AA, and A, (called "7A","6A", 5A", "4A", "3A", "2A", and "1A") based on the schools' student population. Each class has eight regions, numbered 1 through 8, based on the geographic location of the schools involved. Region 1 of each class is usually the southernmost region, with the region numbers generally increasing as one moves north.  Regions realign every two years. Regions generally have ten schools, but can range from 4 to 16 teams.

Class 6A was created for the 2012–2013 school year and Class 7A for the 2016–2017 school year to accommodate growth in local schools.

Competitions

Athletics
Boys athletics governed by the GHSA are: baseball, basketball, cross country, football, golf, lacrosse, riflery (co-ed), soccer, swimming, tennis, track, and wrestling. Girls athletics programs overseen by the GHSA include basketball, competition cheerleading (co-ed & non co-ed), cross country, golf, gymnastics, lacrosse, riflery, fast pitch softball, slow pitch softball, soccer, swimming, tennis, track, volleyball, and wrestling.

Other
Literary activities administered by the GHSA are dramatic interpretation, essay, GHSA Debate, extemporaneous speaking, one act plays, quartet, spelling, trio and vocal solo.

The GHSA has also added Esports as an event.

List of schools
For the 2022–2023 season, GHSA has 457 member schools.

Notes 
 NFHS

References

External links
GHSA official website
In The Game High School Sports Magazine – Recognizing high school athletes and sports in Georgia
 Georgia High School Football Historians Association 
 Georgia Helmet Project (Class 7A, Regions 1 thru 4)
 Georgia Helmet Project (Class 7A, Regions 5 thru 8)
 Georgia Helmet Project (Class AAAAAA Regions 1-4)
 Georgia Helmet Project (Class AAAAAA Regions 5-8)
 Georgia Helmet Project (Class AAAAA Regions 1-4)
 Georgia Helmet Project (Class AAAAA Regions 5-8)
 Georgia Helmet Project (Class AAAA Regions 1-4)
 Georgia Helmet Project (Class AAAA Regions 5-8)
 Georgia Helmet Project (Class AAA Regions 1-4)
 Georgia Helmet Project (Class AAA Regions 5-8)
 Georgia Helmet Project (Class AA Regions 1-4)
 Georgia Helmet Project (Class AA Regions 5-8)
 Georgia Helmet Project (Class A Regions 1-4)
 Georgia Helmet Project (Class A Regions 5-8)

High schools in Georgia (U.S. state)
High school sports associations in the United States
Sports organizations established in 1904
Sports in Georgia (U.S. state)
1904 establishments in Georgia (U.S. state)